Martin Luther King Jr. Plaza may refer to:

Martin Luther King Jr. Plaza (Toledo), a train station served by Amtrak in Toledo, Ohio
Dr. Martin Luther King Jr. Plaza station (Metrorail), a train station served by Metrorail in Gladeview, Florida